Empire is a British film magazine published monthly by Bauer Consumer Media. The first issue was published in May 1989.

History
David Hepworth of Emap, the publisher of British music magazines Q and Smash Hits, among other titles, came up with the idea to publish a magazine similar to Q, but for films. They recruited Smash Hits editor Barry McIlheney to edit the new magazine, with Hepworth as Editorial Director. Hepworth produced a one-page document of what he wanted to achieve. Among them, they planned to review and rate every film that was released in the cinema in the United Kingdom. It also said that "Empire believes that movies can sometimes be art, but they should always be fun." The first edition (June/July 1989) was published in May 1989 with Dennis Quaid and Winona Ryder on the front cover from the film Great Balls of Fire!. The first issue reached its target of 50,000 copies sold.

Film reviews were given a star rating between 1 and 5, with no half stars.

McIlheney edited the first 44 issues, with assistant editor Phil Thomas, who had been working on the magazine since it started, taking over from the March 1993 issue. Thomas became managing editor in 1995 with Q Features Editor Andrew Collins taking over as Empire editor from issue 73 (July 1995); however, after 3 issues, he became editor of Q after Danny Kelly left, with  Empire Features Editor Mark Salisbury promoted to Editor.

A compilation of their film reviews was published in 2006 as the Empire Film Guide.

Bauer purchased Emap Consumer Media in early 2008.

Editors
Empire has had eleven editors:

 Barry McIlheney (issues 1–44)
 Phil Thomas (issues 45–72)
 Andrew Collins (issues 73–75)
 Mark Salisbury (issues 76–88)
 Ian Nathan (issues 89–126)
 Emma Cochrane (issues 127–161)
 Colin Kennedy (162–209) (Will Lawrence acted as editor for 12 issues while Colin Kennedy was absent)
 Mark Dinning (210–304). Dinning was formerly Associate Editor on the magazine leaving to take up the position of Editor of Total Film for a period, he then returned to take up the same role for Empire. He left the magazine in July 2014.
 Morgan Rees (issues 306–315)
 Terri White (issues 318—393)
 Nick De Semlyen (beginning with issue 394) 

 Steven Spielberg guest-edited the magazine's 20th Anniversary Issue in June 2009.
 Sam Mendes guest-edited the magazine's Spectre special in September 2015.

Regular features

Empire reviews both mainstream films and art films, but feature articles concentrate on the former. Ian Freer is a regular reviewer for the magazine.

As well as film news, previews and reviews, Empire has some other regular features. Each issue (with the exception of issues 108–113) features a Classic Scene, a transcript from a notable film scene. The first such classic scene to be featured was the "I coulda been a contender" scene from On the Waterfront.

The Re.View section covers Blu-ray and DVD news and releases. Kim Newman's Movie Dungeon is a regular feature in the Re.View section, in which critic Kim Newman reviews the most obscure releases, mostly low budget horror movies. Newman has written for Empire since the first issue.

How Much Is A Pint of Milk? presents celebrities' answers to silly or unusual questions, including the question "How much is a pint of milk?" This is intended as a guide to the chosen celebrity's contact with reality, and as such can be more informative than a direct interview by reporting some surprising responses. Willem Dafoe was the first interviewee in issue 59 (May 1994).

Each magazine includes a "Spine Quote", in which a relatively challenging quote is printed on the spine of the magazine. There are usually some obvious and obscure links from the quote to the main features of that month's edition. Readers are invited to identify the film source and the links to win a prize.

The Empire Masterpiece
A regular feature since Raging Bull featured in issue 167 (May 2003), the Empire Masterpiece is a two-page essay on a film selected by Empire in the Re.View section. The selection of the films seem to be quite random and follow no specific pattern. Only a few issues since the first masterpiece feature have not featured one – 179, 196–198 and 246. Issue 241 (June 2009) had director Frank Darabont select 223 masterpieces. L.A. Confidential and Magnolia have been featured twice.

Former features
Where Are They Now? featuring past film celebrities and updating on their current professional and personal status first appeared in issue 28 (October 1991) featuring Mark Hamill and John Savage.

My Movie Mastermind was another regular in which a celebrity was given questions about the films they were in or they directed. Celebrities range from Quentin Tarantino and Christopher Lee (who were at the top of the scoreboard) to John Carpenter and Michael Keaton (who were at the bottom of the scoreboard). The feature first appeared in issue 212 (February 2007) with Terry Gilliam.

Special editions

Genre guides
In 2001, Empire published a series of guides to the best films by genre including science fiction, horror, crime, action and comedy.

The Directors Collection
In 2001, Empire published a special issue on Steven Spielberg as part of The Directors Collection.

Fifteenth anniversary
Empire published a special 15th anniversary issue in June 2004 by which time the magazine had reviewed 4,240 theatrical films. Nicole Kidman was named "actress of our lifetime" and Kevin Spacey was named "actor of our lifetime". A list of the 15 most influential films of the preceding 15 years was featured.

Eighteenth anniversary
As part of its 18th birthday issue published in June 2007 Empire published a list of top 18-rated moments in film. They also selected the 50 greatest films rated with an 18 certificate.

Readers' top films
Empire occasionally poll readers to find out what their favourite films are.

A poll of Empire readers was published in September 2001 and listed Star Wars (1977) as the greatest movie of all time.

In March 2006, a readers' poll of The 201 Greatest Movies of All Time had The Shawshank Redemption (1994) as the number one choice.

The 500 Greatest Movies of All Time 
The list was selected in September 2008 by over 10,000 Empire readers, 150 film makers and 50 film critics. The list was accompanied by many different covers, each of which went on sale. The list was topped by The Godfather (1972) and the list's most represented director was Steven Spielberg, who had eleven films in the top 500.

In July 2014, during their 25th anniversary year, a readers' poll of The 301 Greatest Movies of All Time was topped by The Empire Strikes Back (1980).

The 100 Greatest Movies 
In 2017, Empire surveyed five thousand readers to produce a list of the 100 greatest films ever made which was once again topped by The Godfather.

In 2021, they combined reader votes with Empire critics "choices" to create a top 100 list topped by The Lord of the Rings: The Fellowship of the Ring.

Other polls

Readers' top directors
In June 2005, a poll of 10,000 readers was asked to name the greatest film director of all time. In a list of forty directors, Steven Spielberg was granted the honour of greatest director.

Readers' top characters
A poll of Empire readers was conducted in 2008 to create a list of the 100 greatest movie characters, with Tyler Durden from Fight Club (1999) listed first.

In June 2015, Empire'''s readers named the greatest film characters of all time led by Indiana Jones.

 Podcasts Empire launched their first podcast, The Empire Podcast, in March 2012. The podcast is released weekly and is hosted by Chris Hewitt, alongside Helen O'Hara and James Dyer, as well as regularly featuring other Empire journalists such as Amon Warmann, Ben Travis and Terri White. The podcasts features film news, listener questions, interviews and reviews, as well as regularly having 'Spoiler Specials' which take an in-depth look at a single film, including plot spoilers. Many of these episodes are included on a separate subscription-only feed that costs £2.99 per month.

In September 2018, Empire launched a second podcast focussed on television shows, called The Pilot TV Podcast. It is hosted by James Dyer, Terri White and Boyd Hilton.

In July 2022, the podcast won in the  “Best Live Podcast” category at the British Podcast Awards following  a live episode held in Kings Place, London to celebrate the podcast’s 500th episode that included returning favourites of lethal cunning, as well as guests such as Brett Goldstein, Tom Holland and Johnny Knoxville.

Awards

From 1996 until 2018, Empire organised the annual Empire Awards, voted for by readers of the magazine, which were originally sponsored by Sony Ericsson, and from 2009 sponsored by Jameson. The last awards were held in 2018 and after that the awards were discontinued for undisclosed reasons.

See also
 List of film periodicals
 Cahiers du cinéma Sight & Sound''
 The Film Daily annual critics' poll

References

External links
 – official site

Magazines established in 1989
Film magazines published in the United Kingdom
Bauer Group (UK)
Empire Awards
Monthly magazines published in the United Kingdom
1989 establishments in the United Kingdom
Magazines published in London